Gopalan Shyamala (December 7, 1938 – February 11, 2009) was a biomedical scientist at the Lawrence Berkeley National Laboratory,  whose work in isolating and characterizing the progesterone receptor gene stimulated advances in breast biology and oncology. She was the mother of Vice President of the United States Kamala Harris and Maya Harris, a lawyer and political commentator.

Early life and education 
Shyamala was born on December 7, 1938, in Madras, Madras Province, British India (present-day Chennai, Tamil Nadu, India) to Rajam Gopalan and P. V. Gopalan, a civil servant. Her parents were from two villages near the town of Mannargudi in Madras Province. According to The Los Angeles Times, "Gopalan was a Tamil Brahmin, part of a privileged elite in Hinduism’s ancient caste hierarchy". According to Shyamala's brother, Balachandran, their parents were broad-minded in raising the children, all of whom led somewhat unconventional lives. Gopalan began her professional life as a stenographer, rising through the ranks in the civil service, moving the family every few years between Madras, New Delhi, Bombay, and Calcutta.

A gifted singer of Carnatic music, Shyamala won a national competition in it as a teenager. She studied for a BSc in Home Science at Lady Irwin College in Delhi. Her father thought the subject—which taught skills considered helpful in homemaking—was a mismatch for her abilities; her mother expected the children to seek careers in medicine, engineering, or the law. In 1958, aged 19, Shyamala unexpectedly applied to a master's program in nutrition and endocrinology at the University of California, Berkeley, and was accepted. Her parents used some of their retirement savings to pay her tuition and board during the first year. Not having a phone line at home, they communicated with her after her arrival in the US by aerogram. She earned a PhD in nutrition and endocrinology at UC Berkeley in 1964. Shyamala's dissertation, which was supervised by Richard L. Lyman, was titled The isolation and purification of a trypsin inhibitor from whole wheat flour.

Career 
Shyamala conducted research in UC Berkeley's Department of Zoology and Cancer Research Lab. She worked as a breast cancer researcher at University of Illinois at Urbana-Champaign and University of Wisconsin. She worked for 16 years at Lady Davis Institute for Medical Research and McGill University Faculty of Medicine. She served as a peer reviewer for the National Institutes of Health and as a site visit team member for the Federal Advisory Committee. She also served on the President's Special Commission on Breast Cancer. She mentored dozens of students in her lab. For her last decade of research, Shyamala worked in the Lawrence Berkeley National Laboratory.

Research 
Shyamala's research led to advancements in the knowledge of hormones pertaining to breast cancer. Her work in the isolation and characterization of the progesterone receptor gene in mice changed research on the hormone-responsiveness of breast tissue.

Personal life 
In the fall of 1962, at a meeting of the Afro-American Association—a students' group at Berkeley whose members would go on to give structure to the discipline of Black studies, propose the holiday of Kwanzaa, and help establish the Black Panther Party—Shyamala met a graduate student in economics from Jamaica, Donald J. Harris, who was that day's speaker. According to Donald Harris, who is now an emeritus professor of economics at Stanford University, “We talked then, continued to talk at a subsequent meeting, and at another, and another." In 1963 they were married without following the convention of introducing Harris to Shyamala's parents beforehand or having the ceremony in her hometown. In the later 1960s, Donald and Shyamala took their daughters, Kamala, then four or five years old, and Maya, two years younger, to newly independent Zambia, where Shyamala's father, Gopalan, was on an advisory assignment. After Shyamala divorced Donald in the early 1970s, she took her daughters to India several times to visit her parents in Chennai, where they had retired.

The children also visited their father's family in Jamaica as they grew up.

Wanda Kagan, one of Kamala's high school friends in Montreal, described how after she told Kamala her stepfather was molesting her, Shyamala insisted she move in with them for her final year of high school. Kagan said that Shyamala helped her navigate the system to get the support she needed to live independently of her family.

Death
Shyamala died of colon cancer in Oakland on February 11, 2009 at aged 70. She requested that donations be made to the organization Breast Cancer Action. Later in 2009, Kamala Harris carried her ashes to Chennai on the southeastern coast of peninsular India and scattered them in the Indian Ocean waters.

Notes

Selected publications
 Shyamala, G., Y.-C. Chou, S. G. Louie, R. C. Guzman, G. H. Smith, and S. Nandi. 2002. "Cellular expression of estrogen and progesterone receptors in mammary glands: Regulation by hormones, development and aging",  Journal of Steroid Biochemistry and Molecular Biology, 80:137–48.
 Shyamala, G.; Yang, X.; Cardiff, R. D.; Dale, E. (2000). "Impact of progesterone receptor on cell-fate decisions during mammary gland development". Proceedings of the National Academy of Sciences. 97 (7): 3044–49
 Shyamala, G. 1999. "Progesterone signaling and mammary gland morphogenesis". Journal of Mammary Gland Biology and Neoplasia, 4:89–104.
 Shyamala, G., S. G. Louie, I. G. Camarillo, and F. Talamantes. 1999. The progesterone receptor and its isoforms in mammary development. Mol. Genet. Metab. 68:182–90.
 Shyamala, G.; Yang, X.; Silberstein, G.; Barcellos-Hoff, M. H.; Dale, E. (1998). "Transgenic mice carrying an imbalance in the native ratio of A to B forms of progesterone receptor exhibit developmental abnormalities in mammary glands". Proceedings of the National Academy of Sciences. 95 (2): 696–701.
 Shyamala, G., W. Schneider, and D. Schott. 1990. Developmental regulation of murine mammary progesterone receptor gene expression. Endocrinology 126:2882–89.
 Shyamala, G; Gauthier, Y; Moore, S K; Catelli, M G; Ullrich, S J (August 1989). "Estrogenic regulation of murine uterine 90-kilodalton heat shock protein gene expression". Molecular and Cellular Biology. 9 (8): pp. 3567–70. .

References 

1938 births
2009 deaths
20th-century Indian women scientists
20th-century Indian scientists
21st-century Indian women scientists
21st-century Indian scientists

Cancer researchers
Deaths from cancer in California
Deaths from colorectal cancer
Harris family
Indian emigrants to the United States
Lawrence Berkeley National Laboratory people
Academic staff of McGill University
Mothers of vice presidents of the United States
Scientists from Chennai
Delhi University alumni
University of California, Berkeley alumni
University of California, Berkeley faculty
Tamil biologists
Women scientists from Tamil Nadu